Rajvir Singh (born 21 December 1978) is a former Indian international wushu athlete. Presently, he is the Deputy Commandant of the CRPF, IWUF A Grade Judge, National Coach for the Indian Wushu team, former Joint Secretary of the Wushu Association of India and former General Secretary of Delhi Amateur Wushu Association. He had also been a coach of the Indian Police Wushu Team and Delhi Wushu team in many national championships/games. He is most famous for coaching young wushu athletes.

Early life

Singh was born on 21 December 1978. Initially, he discovered his interest in sports at an early age in his school time where he started with athletics. He went on to join the cricket team thereafter. He did his schooling from 1983 to 1996. He joined Dyal Singh College, Delhi  University in 1996 and graduated in 1999. As a promising young athlete, Singh was elected as Vice President of the Student Union in 1998. There, he continued with his passion for practicing the art of Wushu.

Competitive career

Singh began training Wushu at the age of 16. He joined a private Wushu club where he learned the basics of the sport. He won a bronze medal in 56 kg weight category in the National Wushu Championship in Hyderabad in 1996 which was his first national competition. In 2002 and 2003, Singh won Gold Medals (75 kg) in the National Wushu Championships held in Meerut and Chennai respectively. In the South Asian Wushu Championship held in New Delhi, Singh won the bronze medal in the 75 kg weight category. In 2003 Singh was selected to be a member of the Indian Wushu Team and represented India at the 7th World Wushu Championships held in Macau, China. In 2005, Singh joined the Central Reserve Police Force (CRPF) Wushu Team and again won the gold medal (75 kg weight category) at the National Wushu Championship at Lucknow. After competing in the 10th South Asian Games held at Colombo, Sri Lanka in 2006, Singh announced his retirement as a competitive athlete.

After retiring from his playing career he had devoted himself in coaching to uplift the Indian Wushu standards.

Administrative career

Singh was elected as the General Secretary of Delhi Amateur Wushu Association until his resignation in 2016. Thereafter, Singh was elected as the Joint Secretary of the Wushu Association of India from 2003 to 2007, and he worked under the aegis of reputed sports administrators/promoters - Dr.Yogendra Narian (IAS), Dr. Prabhat Kumar (IAS) and Late Shri. Anand Kacker.

Career as International Wushu Judge

In 2004, Singh undertook the International Judges Examination Course in Beijing, China and became the youngest ever judge in Sanshou.  With adjudging in the 9th World Wushu Championship at Beijing, China held in 2007, Singh became the first ever Indian judge who hold this position in two World Wushu Championship consecutively. A year later in 2008, Singh became the first India Wushu Judge to receive an ‘A’ Grade IWUF Judge Licence in Wuhan, China and was also the first Indian athlete to participate in the Traditional World Wushu Championship at Shiyan. In 2012, Singh again attended the International Wushu Judges Examination Course at Bali, Indonesia and successfully renewed his license. After this examination, Singh was awarded the title of Key Referee for his excellent performance by the International Wushu Federation (IWUF). In 2016, Singh attended his fourth International Wushu Judges Examination Course at Wudang Shan, China, as successfully completed. For this course, Singh was again awarded by ‘A Grade’ certification for his excellent performance by International Wushu Federation (IWUF) and his certificate is  valid until 31 December 2020.

Competitions Judged at:

6th Asian Wushu Championships held in Myanmar (2004)
Junior Asian Wushu Championship in Singapore (2005)
8th World Wushu Championship held at Hanoi, Vietnam (2005)
9th World Wushu Championship held at Beijing, China (2007)
Asian Wushu Championship held at Ho Chi Minh City, Vietnam (2012)
17th Asian Games, held at Incheon, South Korea (2014)
12th South Asian Games held at Shillong, Meghalaya, India (2016)

Coaching career

In the year 2000, first time Sports Authority of India introduced a six-week certificate course for Wushu and Singh topped in his batch of this course. Further, he undertook one-year diploma programme in sports coaching for Wushu at the Netaji Subhash, National Institute of Sports (NIS), Sports Authority of India. Singh's batch was a first batch participant for both these courses.

In 2006, under Singh's mentorship, Mr. Gajindera Singh and Ms. K. Chitrabala won bronze medals in Wushu World Cup at Xi’an, China. 
Further, in 10th SAF Games at Colombo, Sri Lanka seven players won laurels for the nation by bagging three gold medals, two silver medals, and two bronze medals. All the players won in this championship was trained by Singh.

Soon after this phenomenal success, the Government of India decided to send three players ( O Joy Singh, Bimoljit Singh & Naresh Kumar all three players were trained by Singh) for the 15th Asian Games at Doha, Qatar.

In 15th Asian Games at Doha, Qatar one of Singh's student Mr. M. Bimoljit Singh created history by winning the first ever medal in Asian Games for India in Wushu sports section. This was an important milestone and was responsible for Wushu's inclusion in the priority list for the Ministry of Youth Affairs & Sports, Government of India.

In 2007, Singh completed his Diploma Course for Advance Wushu from the Beijing Sports University and he was the first Indian to achieve this. Thereafter, the Wushu Association of India appointed him as the coach of Indian National Wushu Team. 
Singh served as the official Indian Wushu Coach and responsible for the National Coaching Camps and India's participation at the various International Championships.

In 2008, Singh was again appointed as the Coach of Indian National Wushu Team for the 7th Asian Wushu Championship which was held at Macau, China. In the same championship under the mentorship and leadership of Rajvir, the team performed exceedingly well and won two Silver and five bronze medals. For this championship, a team of seven members was made who coached by Singh. Ms. W. Sandharani and Mr. Sandeep Yadav who won a medal were his own trainees. 
Same year Singh coached the Indian National Wushu Team for the South Asian Wushu Championship held in Dhaka, Bangladesh. The Indian National Wushu Team yet again proved its metal by grabbing twenty Three  Gold Medals.

In the year 2009, Singh's student Ms. W. Sandhyarani won two medals – one Silver Medal (56 kg) at Asian Martial Arts Games held at Bangkok category, and Bronze Medal (56 kg) in Indoor Asian Games held in Vietnam.

In 2010, Indian Olympic Association, Ministry of Sports & Youth Affairs, Government of India and Wushu Association of India decided to send ten players of Indian Wushu Team to participate at the 16th Asian Games at Guangzhou, China. In this team out of ten members, six were Singh's students who trained under him for over five years. In this Asian Games Singh's student Ms. W. Sandhyarani created history by winning the first silver medal for  India and again Mr. M Bimoljit Singh won his 2nd Bronze Medal for India.

In 2012, after this achievement of Singh, his trainees Santosh Kumar won Silver Medal & O Joy Singh won bronze medal in Asian Wushu Championship at Ho Chi Minh City, Vietnam. While same year Narender Grewal won bronze medal in Junior World Wushu Championship, 2012.

In 2013, three players of Indian Wushu Team, Pooja Kadian won silver medal, Bronze Medal was clinched by W. Sandhyarani Devi] and Santosh Kumar in the 12th World Wushu Championship held at Kuala Lumpur, Malaysia. The team coach Singh acted as the masseur for them & this year Pooja Kadian won silver medal in World Games.

In 2014, 2nd-time  Singh was selected as Judge in 17th Asian Games, 2014 held at Incheon, South Korea. While In this Games two players of Indian Wushu Team won bronze medal, one by Y Sanathoi Devi (52 kg) and other Medal by his trainee  Narender Grewal] (60 kg).
After Asian Games, 2014 three players of Indian Wushu Team, Santosh Kumar (Gold Medal), Sandhyarani Devi and Pooja Kadian (Bronze Medal) in Sanda World Cup held at Jakarta, Indonesia.

In 2015, under the mentorship of Singh, Indian Wushu Team participated in 5th Paras Cup held at Tehran, Iran and won India's first ever gold medal by L Budhchandra Singh (56 kg), two Silver and two bronze medal in this championship. 
Same year Singh was appointed as a Coach of Indian Wushu Team for 13th World Wushu Championship held at Jakarta, Indonesia by Wushu Association of India. The whole year he trained the campers for World Championship in National Coaching Camp. Because of his efforts, Indian Wushu Team Won 3 Silver Medal(Ms. Y. Sanathoi, Ms. Pooja Kadian and Uchit Sharma) & 1 Bronze Medal (Bhanu Pratap Singh) in this championship. This was the best ever result of Indian Wushu Team. 
After the great performance in 13th World Wushu Championship, in 2016 Singh was appointed as Coach of Indian Junior Wushu Team to improve the performance of junior players in international level. In this competition also Indian Wushu Team created history by winning India's first ever gold medal in World Championship by Y. Jason Singh (52 kg). While Th. Malemganbi Devi won Silver Medal (52 kg) and N. Roshibina Devi won Bronze Medals (48 kg).

In 2016, Pooja Kadian won Bronze Medal ( 70 kg) in Asian Wushu Championship at Taiwan and Sanda World Cup held at China. Apart from this Indian Wushu Team won one gold medal by Pooja Kadian ( 70 kg) and one bronze medal by Pradeep Kumar(75 kg) in 12th South Asian Games held at Shillong, India.

In 2017, again Singhr was appointed as the Coach of Indian Wushu Team for the 14th World Wushu Championship. And India's got his first ever gold medal in any Senior World Level Championship by his trainee Pooja Kaidan.  The Indian Team excel his performance by winning one Gold Medal (Pooja Kaidan) & four players won bronze medals.

After World Championship under his coaching, Indian Wushu Team won five Silver & five bronze medals in 1st Sanda Asia Cup at Guangzhou, China.

In 2018, Indian Wushu team again created history by winning four bronze medal in 18th Asian Games held at Jakarta, Indonesia under the able coaching of Singh along with two alternative coaches Kuldeep Handoo & Rajesh Kumar. 
Before the World Championship under his coaching, Indian Wushu Team won three Silver, two bronze medal in 7th Pars Cup held at Gorgen, Iran in 2018.

Singh's undying passion and commitment for the Wushu sport won its best appreciation when in 2011 one of his Trainee Ms. W. Sandhyarani was recommended by the Arjuna Award committee to receive the prestigious Arjuna Award in Wushu. In 2012 M Bimoljit Singh's name was nominated for this prestigious Arjun Award and after this, he became the 2nd player of Wushu who got this award. In 2012 awarded by this Arjun Award. And in 2018 Pooja Kadian awarded by Arjun Award. This was fourth Arjuna Award for Wushu out of four awards three are awarded to his trainees.

Coaching Career in CRPF

Singh join CRPF in 2005 as Sub Inspector as a player but he was NIS Qualified also so department gave him the responsibility as Coach of CRPF also.  Under his coaching in International and National Level, CRPF Wushu team won a total of 419 Medals. 28 Gold, 31 Silver & 46 Bronze Medal in International events and 169 Gold, 73 Silver and 72 Bronze Medals in National Levels.
In 2014, Singh got an out of turn promotion, Inspector to Asst. Commandant for his outstanding performance as a coach. 
Under his able coaching CRPF wushu players excelled and won laurels for Department & for Country, CRPF Wushu players Ms. Pooja Kadian become first World Champion in Wushu sports in 2017, M Bimoljit Singh won two time bronze medal in two Asian Games 2006 & 2010 & W Sandhyarani Devi Won lone silver medal until date  for country since ( 2006)  Indian Wushu team participated in Asian Games.

References

Other sources
 https://www.sundayguardianlive.com/sports/unknown-sport-india-called-wushu
 https://www.dailypioneer.com/2018/sunday-edition/stars-behind-superstars.html
 http://www.newindianexpress.com/sport/other/2018/may/11/wushu-high-on-target-olympic-podium-scheme-shot-1813058.html
 https://www.khaskhabar.com/sports/other-sports/sports-news-pooja-kadian-to-lead-indian-team-in-first-asian-wushu-cup-news-hindi-1-278018-KKN.html
 https://timesofindia.indiatimes.com/sports/more-sports/others/india-win-10-medals-in-wushu-sanda-asian-cup/articleshow/62106763.cm
 https://www.dailypioneer.com/2015/sports/is-wushu-coming-of-age.html
 http://www.newindianexpress.com/sport/other/2017/jun/27/china-trip-likely-for-wushu-teams-1621249.html
 https://www.mid-day.com/articles/asian-games-2018-referees-cant-bear-to-see-india-succeed-in-wushu-says-coach-handoo/19733164
 https://www.dailypioneer.com/2018/sunday-edition/stars-behind-superstars.html

1978 births
Living people
People from New Delhi
Indian wushu practitioners
Indian sanshou practitioners
Wushu practitioners in India